Echinopsis macrogona, syn. Trichocereus macrogonus, is a species of cactus found in Bolivia.

Description
The stem is bluish green with 6–9 prominent ribs.

References

macrogona
Flora of Bolivia
Cacti of South America